Négritude (from French "Nègre" and "-itude" to denote a condition that can be translated as "Blackness") is a framework of critique and literary theory, developed mainly by francophone intellectuals, writers, and politicians of the African diaspora during the 1930s, aimed at raising and cultivating "Black consciousness" across Africa and its diaspora. Négritude gathers writers such as sisters Paulette and Jeanne Nardal (known for having laid the theoretical basis of the movement), Martinican poet Aimé Césaire, Abdoulaye Sadji, Léopold Sédar Senghor (the first President of Senegal), and Léon Damas of French Guiana. Négritude intellectuals disavowed colonialism, racism and Eurocentrism. They promoted African culture within a framework of persistent Franco-African ties. The intellectuals employed Marxist political philosophy, in the Black radical tradition. The writers drew heavily on a surrealist literary style, and some say they were also influenced somewhat by the Surrealist stylistics, and in their work often explored the experience of diasporic being, asserting ones' self and identity, and ideas of home, home-going and belonging.

Négritude inspired the birth of many movements across the Afro-Diasporic world, including Afro-Surrealism, Creolite in the Caribbean, and black is beautiful in the United States. Frantz Fanon often made reference to Négritude in his writing.

Etymology
 is a constructed noun from the 1930s based upon the French word nègre, which, like its English counterpart, was derogatory and had a different meaning from "black man". The movement's use of the word négritude was a way of re-imagining the word as an emic form of empowerment. The term was first used in its present sense by Aimé Césaire, in the third issue (May-June 1935) of L'Étudiant noir, a magazine that he had started in Paris with fellow students Léopold Senghor and Léon Damas, as well as Gilbert Gratiant, Leonard Sainville, Louis T. Achille, Aristide Maugée, and Paulette Nardal. The word appears in Césaire's first published work, "Conscience Raciale et Révolution Sociale," with the heading "Les Idées" and the rubric "Négreries", which is notable for its disavowal of assimilation as a valid strategy for resistance and for its use of the word  as a positive term. The problem with assimilation was that one assimilated into a culture that considered African culture to be barbaric and unworthy of being seen as "civilized". The assimilation into this culture would have been seen as an implicit acceptance of this view. Nègre previously had been used mainly in a pejorative sense. Césaire deliberately incorporated this derogatory word into the name of his philosophy. Césaire's choice of the -itude suffix has been criticized, with Senghor noting that "the term négritude has often been contested as a word before being contested as a concept," but the suffix allows Césaire to trope the vocabulary of racist science.

Influences
In 1885, Haitian anthropologist Anténor Firmin published an early work De l'égalité des races humaines (On the Equality of Human Races), which was published as a rebuttal to French writer Count Arthur de Gobineau's Essai sur l'inégalité des Races Humaines (An Essay on the Inequality of the Human Races). Firmin influenced Jean Price-Mars, the initiator of Haitian ethnology and developer of the concept of Indigenism, and 20th-century American anthropologist Melville Herskovits. Black intellectuals have historically been proud of Haiti due to its slave revolution commanded by Toussaint Louverture during the 1790s. Césaire spoke, thus, of Haiti as being "where négritude stood up for the first time".

The Harlem Renaissance, a literary style developed in Harlem in Manhattan during the 1920s and 1930s, influenced the Négritude philosophy. The Harlem Renaissance's writers, including Langston Hughes, Richard Wright, Claude McKay, Alain Locke and W.E.B. Du Bois addressed the themes of "noireism", race relations and "double-consciousness".

During the 1920s and 1930s, young black students and scholars primarily from France's colonies and territories assembled in Paris, where they were introduced to writers of the Harlem Renaissance, namely Langston Hughes and Claude McKay, by Paulette Nardal and her sister Jane. The Nardal sisters contributed to the Négritude discussions in their writings and also owned the Clamart Salon, a tea-shop venue of the Afro-French intelligentsia where the philosophy of Négritude was often discussed and where the concept for La Revue du Monde Noir was conceived. Paulette Nardal and the Haitian Dr. Leo Sajou initiated La Revue du Monde Noir (1931–32), a literary journal published in English and French, which attempted to appeal to African and Caribbean intellectuals in Paris. This Harlem inspiration was shared by the parallel development of negrismo and acceptance of "double-apparantence", double-consciousness, in the Spanish-speaking Caribbean region.

The Nardal sisters were responsible for the introduction of the Harlem Renaissance and its ideas to Césaire, Senghor, and Damas. In a letter from February 1960, Senghor admits the importance of the Nardal sisters, "We were in contact with these black Americans during the years 1929-34 through Mademoiselle Paulette Nardall...kept a literary salon where African Negroestrans, West Indians, and American Negroes used to get together." Jane Nardal's 1929 article "Internationalisme noir" predates Senghor's first critical theory piece "What the Black Man Contributes", itself published in 1939. This essay, "Internationalisme noir," focuses on race consciousness in the African diaspora and cultural metissage, double-apparentance; seen as the philosophical foundation for the Négritude movement. The Nardal sisters, for all their ideas and the importance of their Clamart Salon, have been minimized in the development of Négritude by the masculinist domination of the movement. Paulette even wrote as much in 1960 when she "bitterly complained" about the lack of acknowledgment to her and her sister Jane regarding their importance to a movement historically and presently credited to Césaire, Senghor, and Damas. The name Nardal belongs in that list.

Development during the 20th century
Each of the initiators had his own ideas about the purpose and styles of Négritude, the philosophy was characterized generally by opposition to colonialism, denunciation of Europe's alleged inhumanity, and rejection of Western domination and ideas. The movement also appears to have had some Heideggerian strands in the sense that its goal was to achieve black people's' "being-in-the-world", to emphasize that black individuals did have a history and a worthy culture capable of standing alongside the cultures of other countries as equals. Also important was the acceptance of and pride in being black and a celebration of African history, traditions, and beliefs. Their literary style was surrealistic and they cherished Marxist ideas.

Motivation for the Négritude movement was a result of Aimé Césaire's, Leopold Senghor's, and Leon Damas's dissatisfaction, disgust, and personal conflict over the state of the Afro-French experience in France. All three shared a personal sense of revolt for the racism and colonial injustices that plagued their world and their French education. Senghor refused to believe that the purpose of his education was "to build Christianity and civilization in his soul where there was only paganism and barbarism before". Césaire's disgust came as embarrassment when he was accused by some of the people of the Caribbean as having nothing to do with the people of Africa—whom they saw as savages. They separated themselves from Africa and proclaimed themselves as civilized. He denounced the writers from the Caribbean as "intellectually... corrupt and literarily nourished with white decadence". Damas believed this because of the pride these writers would take when a white person could read their whole book and not be able to tell the author's complexion.

Aimé Césaire

Césaire was a poet, playwright, and politician from Martinique. He studied in Paris, where he discovered the black community and "rediscovered Africa". He saw Négritude as the fact of being black, acceptance of this fact, and appreciation of the history and culture, and of black people. It is important to note that for Césaire, this emphasis on the acceptance of the fact of "blackness" was the means by which the "decolonization of the mind" could be achieved. According to him, western imperialism was responsible for the inferiority complex of black people. He sought to recognize the collective colonial experience of black individuals —the slave trade and plantation system. Césaire's ideology was especially important during the early years of Négritude.

Neither Césaire—who after returning to Martinique after his studies was elected mayor of Fort de France, the capital, and a representative of Martinique in France's Parliament—nor Senghor in Senegal, envisaged political independence from France.

Leopold Senghor

Négritude would, according to Senghor, enable black people in French lands to have a "seat at the give and take of the [French] table as equals". However, the French eventually granted Senegal and its other African colonies independence. Poet and later the first president of Sénégal, Senghor used Négritude to work toward a universal valuation of African people. He advocated a modern incorporation of the expression and celebration of traditional African customs and ideas. This interpretation of Négritude tended to be the most common, particularly during later years.

Leon Damas

Damas was a French Guianese poet and National Assembly member. He had a militant style of defending "black qualities" and rejected any kind of reconciliation with Caucasians. Two particular anthologies were pivotal to the movement; one was published by Damas in 1946, Poètes d'expression française 1900–1945. Senghor would then go on to publish Anthologie de la nouvelle poésie nègre et malgache de langue française in 1948. Damas's introduction to the work and the poetic anthology was meant to be a sort of manifesto for the movement, but Senghor's own anthology eventually took that role. Though it would be the "Preface" written by French philosopher and public intellectual Jean-Paul Sartre for the anthology that would propel Négritude into the broader intellectual conversation.

Damas' introduction was more political and cultural in nature. A distinctive feature of his anthology and beliefs was that Damas felt his message was one for the colonized in general, and included poets from Indochina and Madagascar. This is sharply in contrast to Senghor's anthology. In the introduction Damas proclaimed that now was the age where "the colonized man becomes aware of his rights and of his duties as a writer, as a novelist or a storyteller, an essayist or a poet." Damas outlines the themes of the work. He says, "Poverty, illiteracy, exploitation of man by man, social and political racism suffered by the black or the yellow, forced labor, inequalities, lies, resignation, swindles, prejudices, complacencies, cowardice, failure, crimes committed in the name of liberty, of equality, of fraternity, that is the theme of this indigenous poetry in French." Damas' introduction was indeed a calling and affirmation for a distinct cultural identification.

Reception
In 1948, Jean-Paul Sartre analyzed the négritude philosophy in an essay called "Orphée Noir" ("Black Orpheus") that served as the introduction to a volume of francophone poetry named Anthologie de la nouvelle poésie nègre et malgache, compiled by Léopold Senghor. In this essay, Sartre characterizes négritude as the opposite of colonial racism in a Hegelian dialectic and with it he helped to introduce Négritude issues to French intellectuals. In his opinion, négritude was an "anti-racist racism" (racisme antiraciste), a strategy with a final goal of racial unity.

Négritude was criticized by some Black writers during the 1960s as insufficiently militant. Keorapetse Kgositsile said that the term Négritude was based too much on Blackness according to a European aesthetic, and was unable to define a new kind of perception of African-ness that would free Black people and Black art from Caucasian conceptualizations altogether.

The Nigerian dramatist, poet, and novelist Wole Soyinka opposed Négritude. He believed that by deliberately and outspokenly being proud of their ethnicity, Black people were automatically on the defensive. According to some, he said: "Un tigre ne proclame pas sa tigritude, il saute sur sa proie" (French: A tiger doesn't proclaim its tigerness; it jumps on its prey). But in fact, Soyinka wrote in a 1960 essay for the Horn, "the duiker will not paint 'duiker' on his beautiful back to proclaim his duikeritude; you'll know him by his elegant leap."

After a long period of silence there has been a renaissance of Négritude developed by scholars such as Souleymane Bachir Diagne (Columbia University), Donna Jones (University of California, Berkeley), and Cheikh Thiam (Ohio State University) who all continue the work of Abiola Irele (1936–2017). Cheikh Thiam's book is the only book-length study of Négritude as philosophy. It develops Diagne's reading of Négritude as a philosophy of art, and Jones' presentation of Négritude as a lebensphilosophie.

Other uses

American physician Benjamin Rush, a signer of the United States Declaration of Independence and early abolitionist, is often said to have used the term negritude to imagine a rhetorical "disease" which he said was a mild form of leprosy, the only cure of which was to become white. But this attribution has been disputed as a misreading of secondary sources. If there was such use, it might not have been known by the Afro-Francophones who developed the philosophy of Négritude during the 20th century. Still, Léopold Sédar Senghor did claim that he and Aimé Césaire were aware of discourse surrounding race and revolution from the USA.

Novelist Norman Mailer used the term to describe boxer George Foreman's physical and psychological presence in his book The Fight, a journalistic treatment of the legendary Ali vs. Foreman "Rumble in the Jungle" bout in Kinshasa, Zaire (now Democratic Republic of the Congo) in October 1974.

The word is also used by the rapper Youssoupha in his eponymous album "Négritude" but also before this one.

See also
 Black Skin, White Masks
 Black Consciousness Movement
 Black Surrealism
Black Arts Movement
Black Power Movement
Angolanidade ("Angolan-ness")
Authenticité
 Afro-pessimism
Afro-Surrealism

Notes

References
Christian Filostrat, "La Négritude et la 'Conscience raciale et révolution sociale' d'Aimé Césaire". Présence Francophone, No. 21, Automne 1980, pp. 119–130.
Sartre, Jean-Paul. "Orphée Noir". Anthologie de la nouvelle poésie nègre et malgache. ed. Léopold Senghor. Paris: Presses Universitaires de France, p. xiv (1948).
.

 Rabanka, Leiland. « The Negritude Movement: W.E.B. Du Bois, Leon Damas, Aimé Césaire,  Léopold Senghor, Frantz Fanon, and the Evolution of an Insurgent Idea. » Lexington Books, 2015.
 Sharpley-Whiting, T. Denean. “Femme Négritude: Jane Nardal, La Dépêche Africaine, and the Francophone New Negro.” Souls (Boulder, Colo.), vol. 2, no. 4, Taylor & Francis Group, 2000, pp. 8–17,

Bibliography
Original texts
Césaire, Aimé: Return to My Native Land, Bloodaxe Books, 1997, 
Césaire, Aimé: Discourse on Colonialism, Monthly Review Press (1950), 2000, 
 Damas, Léon-Gontran, Poètes d'expression française.Paris: Editions du Seuil, 1947
 Damas, Léon-Gontan, Mine de Rien, Poèmes inédits.
 Diop, Birago, Leurres et lueurs. Paris: Présence Africaine, 1960
 Senghor, Léopold Sedar, The Collected Poetry, University of Virginia Press, 1998
 Senghor, Léopold Sédar, Ce que je crois. Paris: Grasset, 1988
 Tadjo, Véronique, Red Earth/Latérite. Spokane, Washington: Eastern Washington University Press, 2006

Secondary literature
 Filostrat, Christian. Negritude Agonistes, Africana Homestead Legacy Publishers, 2008, 
 Irele, Abiola. "Négritude or black cultural nationalism." Journal of Modern African Studies 3.3 (1965): 321-348.
 Le Baron, Bentley. "Négritude: A Pan-African Ideal?." Ethics 76.4 (1966): 267-276 online.
 Reilly, Brian J. "Négritude Contretemps: The Coining and Reception of Aimé Césaire's Neologism." Philological Quarterly 99.4 (2020): 377–98.
 Rexer, Raisa. "Black and White and Re(a)d All Over: L'Étudiant noir, Communism, and the Birth of Négritude." Research in African Literatures 44.4 (2013): 1-14.
 Sharpley-Whiting, T. Denean.  Negritude Women, University of Minnesota Press, 2002, 
 Stovall, Tyler, "Aimé Césaire and the making of black Paris." French Politics, Culture & Society 27#3 (2009): 44–46
 Thiam, Cheikh.  Return to the Kingdom of Childhood: Re-envisioning the Legacy and Philosophical Relevance of Negritude (Ohio State UP,  2014)
 Thompson, Peter, Negritude and Changing Africa: An Update, in Research in African Literatures, Winter 2002
 Thompson, Peter, Négritude et nouveaux mondes—poésie noire: africaine, antillaise et malgache. Concord, Mass: Wayside Publishing, 1994
 Wilder, Gary. The French Imperial Nation-State: Negritude & Colonial Humanism Between the Two World Wars (U of Chicago Press, 2005) 
 Wilder, Gary. Freedom time: Negritude, decolonization, and the future of the world (Duke University Press, 2015).

Filmography
Négritude: Naissance et expansion du concept a documentary by Nathalie Fave and Jean-Baptiste Fave, first minutes online, with the interventions of Amadou Lamine Sall, Racine Senghor, Lylian Kesteloot, Jean-Louis Roy, Jacqueline Lemoine, Gérard Chenêt, Victor Emmanuel Cabrita, Nafissatou Dia Diouf, Amadou Ly, Youssoufa Bâ, Raphaël Ndiaye, Alioune Badara Bèye, Hamidou Dia, Georges Courrèges, Baba Diop; Maison Africaine de la Poésie Internationale. Shot in Sénégal in 2005, 56' (DVD)

External links

Noir, Journal Mensuel de l'Association des Etudiants Martiniquais en France, PREMIERE ANNEE N. 3 MAI-JUN 1935,
Césaire et l'introduction de la notion "négritude"

1930s in Africa
African and Black nationalism
African philosophy
Black (human racial classification)
French Caribbean
French West Africa
Latin American literature
Literary movements
Pan-Africanism
Postcolonialism